William Oliphant may refer to:

 William Oliphant (died after 1313), Governor of Sterling Castle during the Wars of Scottish Independence
 William Oliphant, Lord of Aberdalgie (died 1329), Scottish knight during the Wars of Scottish Independence
 William Oliphant, Lord Newton (1551–1628), Scottish judge
 William Oliphant, Sr. (1893–1947), founder of Oliphant's Gym, believed to be the oldest gym in North America
 William J. Oliphant (1845–1930), American photographer